Limerick was a parliamentary constituency represented in Dáil Éireann, the lower house of the Irish parliament or Oireachtas, from 1923 and 1948, elected on the system of proportional representation by means of the single transferable vote (PR-STV). It covered the entire city and county of Limerick. Another constituency of the same name existed between 2011 and 2016, which was later renamed as Limerick County.

History and boundaries
The constituency was a 7-seat constituency under the Electoral Act 1923 for the 1923 general election to Dáil Éireann; those elected comprised the 4th Dáil. It succeeded the constituencies of Limerick City–Limerick East and Kerry–Limerick West which were used to elect members to the 2nd Dáil and the 3rd Dáil.

It covered Limerick city and all of County Limerick. It continued in existence when a revision took effect in 1937. It was abolished at the 1948 Irish general election, when it was replaced by the two new constituencies of Limerick East and Limerick West.

TDs

Elections

1944 general election

1943 general election

1938 general election

1937 general election

1933 general election

1932 general election
The number of and full figures for later counts are not available. Bennett, Bourke, Colbert, Crowley, O'Shaughnessy, Reidy and Ryan were all elected.

September 1927 general election

June 1927 general election

1924 by-election
Following the resignation of Cumann na nGaedheal TD Richard Hayes, a by-election was held on 28 May 1924. The seat was won by the Cumann na nGaedheal candidate Richard O'Connell.

1923 general election
Full figures for the remaining 16 counts are not available. The following are the number of votes unsuccessful candidates had at the time of their elimination though the counts which some eliminations occurred are unknown due to data being unavailable; Mackey 143, Larkin 509, J. O'Brien 766, Cleary 996, O'Callaghan 1,159, W. O'Brien 1,273, Walshe 1,706, Laffin 2,197, Colivet 2,249, Quaide 2,468, Keyes 2,808 and Smyth 3,509

Michael Gallagher notes that newspapers at the time reported there was a 'discrepancy' with the original first count results, leading to a recount. The results below are of the first count which occurred so may not be fully accurate, the results of the recount are unavailable.

See also
 Dáil constituencies
 Politics of the Republic of Ireland
 Historic Dáil constituencies
 Elections in the Republic of Ireland

References

External links
 Oireachtas Members Database

Historic constituencies in County Limerick
Dáil constituencies in the Republic of Ireland (historic)
1923 establishments in Ireland
1948 disestablishments in Ireland
Constituencies established in 1923
Constituencies disestablished in 1948